K. Madhu is an Indian film director and producer who works predominantly in the Malayalam film industry. He made his debut with  Malarum Kiliyum and has directed over 30  feature films in various languages (Malayalam, Tamil, Telugu & Kannada).

Participations 

 Member Jury of Indian Official Entry to Oscar Award
 Member Jury of Kerala State Film Award Committee
 Member Jury of the Sathyan Award Committee
 Former member of the Board of Directors of KSFDC
 Former General Secretary of MACTA
 Former Chairman of MACTA
 Former Exe. Member in Malayala Chalachitra Parishath
 Former President of Directors Union of Kerala.
 Founder Treasurer of Upasana Film Society, Haripad
 Member of FEFKA
 Member of Kerala Film Producers Association
 Associated with Film Societies since 1977

FEFKA: Film Employees Federation of Kerala

KSFDC: Kerala State Film Development Corporation 

MACTA: Malayalam Cine Technicians Association

Filmography

References

External links
 

Living people
Malayali people
20th-century Indian film directors
Malayalam film directors
21st-century Indian film directors
Film directors from Kerala
People from Alappuzha district
Year of birth missing (living people)